Kurukh (Devanagari: कुंड़ुख़), also Kurux, Oraon or Uranw, is a Dravidian language spoken by the  Kurukh (Oraon) and Kisan people of East India. It is spoken by about two million people in the Indian states of Jharkhand, Chhattisgarh, Odisha, West Bengal, Assam, Bihar and Tripura, as well as by 65,000 in northern Bangladesh, 28,600 of a dialect called Uranw in Nepal and about 5,000 in Bhutan. Some Kurukh speakers are in Andaman and Nicobar Islands. It is most closely related to the Malto language. It is marked as being in a "vulnerable" state in UNESCO's list of endangered languages. The Kisan dialect has 206,100 speakers as of 2011.

Classification
Kurukh belongs to the Northern Dravidian group of the Dravidian family languages, and is closely related to Sauria Paharia and Kumarbhag Paharia, which are often together referred to as Malto.

Writing systems

Kurukh is written in Devanagari, a script also used to write Sanskrit, Hindi, Marathi, Nepali and other Indo-Aryan languages. In 1999, Narayan Oraon, a doctor, invented the alphabetic Tolong Siki script specifically for Kurukh. Many books and magazines have been published in Tolong Siki script, and it saw official recognition by the state of Jharkhand in 2007. The Kurukh Literary Society of India has been instrumental in spreading the Tolong Siki script for Kurukh literature.

Geographical distribution
Kurukh language spoken mostly in Raigarh, Surguja, Jashpur of Chhattisgarh, Gumla, Ranchi, Lohardaga, Latehar, simdega  of Jharkhand, Jharsuguda, Sundargarh and Sambalpur district of Odisha.

It is also spoken in Jalpaiguri district of West Bengal, Assam and Tripura states by Kurukh who are mostly Tea-garden workers.

Speakers
It is spoken by 2,053,000 people from the Oraon and Kisan tribes, with 1,834,000 and 219,000 speakers respectively. The literacy rate is 23% in Oraon and 17% in Kisan. Despite the large number of speakers, the language is considered to be endangered. The governments of Jharkhand and Chhattisgarh have introduced the Kurukh language in schools with majority Kurukhar students. Jharkhand and West Bengal both list Kurukh as an official language of their respective states. Bangladesh also has some speakers.

Phonology

Vowels 
Kurukh has five cardinal vowels. Each vowel has long, short nasalized and long nasalized counterparts.

Consonants 
The table below illustrates the articulation of the consonants.

Education
Kurukh languages is taught as a subject in the schools of Jharkhand, Chhattishgarh, Madhya Pradesh, Odisha, West Bengal and Assam.

Sample phrases

Alternative names and dialects
Kurukh has a number of alternative names such as Uraon, Kurux, Kunrukh, Kunna, Urang, Morva, and Birhor. Two dialects, Oraon and Kisan, have 73% intelligibility between them. Oraon but not Kisan is currently being standardised. Kisan is currently endangered, with a decline rate of 12.3% from 1991 to 2001.

References

Further reading
 Andronov, M. S. “Elements of Kurux Historical Phonology”. In: Anthropos 69, no. 1/2 (1974): 250–53. http://www.jstor.org/stable/40458519.
 Kobayashi, Masato. "Review of Viewing Proto-Dravidian from the Northeast, by Martin Pfeiffer". In: Journal of the American Oriental Society 140, no. 2 (2020): 467–81.

External links

Kurukh basic lexicon at the Global Lexicostatistical Database
Proposal to encode Tolong Siki
Omniglot's page on Tolong Siki

Agglutinative languages
Dravidian languages 
Languages of India
Languages of Jharkhand
Languages of Odisha
Subject–object–verb languages
Brahmic scripts